Ithome aquila is a moth in the family Cosmopterigidae. It was described by Ronald W. Hodges in 1978. It is found in North America, where it has been recorded from Florida.

Adults have been recorded from October to January and in May.

The larvae feed on the flowers of Pithecellobium unguis-cati.

References

Moths described in 1978
Chrysopeleiinae